Long An is a province in the Mekong Delta region of southern Vietnam. The provincial capital is Tân An, and other major districts include Kiến Tường, Bến Lức, Cần Giuộc and Đức Hòa. There are 15 districts within the province (included 1 provincial capital city and 1 district-level town).

The region is between Ho Chi Minh City in the north and the Mekong Delta. Because of its low lying geography, it is susceptible to sea level rise caused by climate change.

Geography 
Long An is situated in an advantageous position in the Southern Key Economic Region of Vietnam. It serves as a bridge between Ho Chi Minh City in the north and 12 provinces in the Mekong Delta in the south. The province also has Cambodia to its west and the East Sea (South China Sea) to its east.

Long An is a low-lying coastal region, and therefore some areas of it are subject to flooding during the rainy season, which lasts from the beginning of August until November.

The province has numerous rivers. Two of the main ones are the Vàm Cỏ Đông and Vàm Cỏ Tay, which connect with the Tiền to form a larger river system.  Another important river in the region is the Soài Rạp.

Administrative divisions 
Long An is subdivided into 15 district-level sub-divisions:

 13 districts:
 Bến Lức
 Cần Đước
 Cần Giuộc
 Châu Thành
 Đức Hòa
 Đức Huệ
 Mộc Hóa
 Tân Hưng
 Tân Thạnh
 Tân Trụ
 Thạnh Hóa
 Thủ Thừa
 Vĩnh Hưng
 1 district-level town:
 Kiến Tường
 1 provincial city:
 Tân An (capital)

They are further subdivided into 14 commune-level towns (or townlets), 166 communes, and 12 wards.

Climate change concerns 

Being a low-lying coastal region, Long An is particularly susceptible to floods resulting from rises in sea level due to climate change. The Climate Change Research Institute at Can Tho University, in studying the possible consequences of climate change, has predicted that 49% of Long An province is expected to be flooded if sea levels rise by one meter.

Universities 
Long An is home to two large universities:

 Long An University of Economics and Industry
 Tan Tao University

Hospitals 
 TWG Hospital Long An
136C ĐT827, P7, Tân An, Long An 82100, Vietnam

References

External links 
  
  

 
Provinces of Vietnam